Willie Wilson (9 October 1941 – November 2001) was a Scottish football goalkeeper who played in the Scottish Football League for Hibernian, Berwick Rangers and Cowdenbeath.

Wilson played in a number of European ties for Hibernian, including a famous 5–0 victory against Napoli.

He died in November 2001, following major heart surgery.

References

1941 births
2001 deaths
Scottish footballers
Association football goalkeepers
Hibernian F.C. players
Berwick Rangers F.C. players
Cowdenbeath F.C. players
Scottish Football League players
Footballers from East Lothian